Mauro Job Pontes Júnior (born 10 December 1989), commonly known as Maurinho, is a Brazilian footballer who plays as a forward.

Honours

Club
PT Prachuap FC
 Thai League Cup (1) : 2019

References

External links

1989 births
Living people
People from Canoas
Brazilian footballers
Sportspeople from Rio Grande do Sul
Association football forwards
Campeonato Brasileiro Série A players
Campeonato Brasileiro Série B players
Campeonato Brasileiro Série C players
Campeonato Brasileiro Série D players
Clube Atlético Metropolitano players
Sport Club Internacional players
ABC Futebol Clube players
Criciúma Esporte Clube players
Oeste Futebol Clube players
Avaí FC players
FC Dinamo Minsk players
K League 1 players
Jeonnam Dragons players
FC Seoul players
Thai League 1 players
PT Prachuap F.C. players
Brazilian expatriate footballers
Brazilian expatriate sportspeople in Belarus
Brazilian expatriate sportspeople in South Korea
Brazilian expatriate sportspeople in Thailand
Expatriate footballers in Belarus
Expatriate footballers in South Korea
Expatriate footballers in Thailand
Associação Ferroviária de Esportes players
Vila Nova Futebol Clube players
Esporte Clube Novo Hamburgo players
Esporte Clube São Bernardo players
Botafogo Futebol Clube (PB) players
Clube Esportivo Aimoré players
Uberlândia Esporte Clube players